Independence Municipal Airport  is a city-owned public-use airport located three nautical miles (6 km) southwest of the central business district of Independence, a city in Buchanan County, Iowa, United States. As per the FAA's National Plan of Integrated Airport Systems for 2009-2013, it is classified as a general aviation airport.

Although most U.S. airports use the same three-letter location identifier for the FAA and IATA, this airport is assigned IIB by the FAA but has no designation from the IATA.

Facilities and aircraft 
It has one runway designated 18/36 with a concrete surface measuring 5,500 by 100 feet (1,676 x 30 m).

For the 12-month period ending March 26, 2009, the airport had 9,100 aircraft operations, an average of 24 per day: 87% general aviation, 12% military and 1% air taxi. At that time there were 24 aircraft based at this airport: 79% single-engine, 4% multi-engine and 17% ultralight.

References

External links 
 Independence Municipal (IIB) at Iowa DOT Airport Directory
 Aerial photo as of 19 May 1994 from USGS The National Map
 

Airports in Iowa
Transportation buildings and structures in Buchanan County, Iowa